Ben Briscoe (born 11 March 1934) is an Irish former Fianna Fáil politician. He was a Teachta Dála (TD) for 37 years, representing constituencies in the south Dublin city area.

Member of Dáil Éireann
Briscoe was first elected to Dáil Éireann as a Fianna Fáil TD for the Dublin South-West constituency at the 1965 general election, succeeding his father Robert Briscoe who had been a TD for 38 years. He was elected at the 1969 general election for Dublin South-Central, where he was re-elected in 1973, and after major boundary changes for the 1977 general election he was elected for the Dublin Rathmines West constituency. A subsequent boundary revision in advance of the 1981 general election abolished Dublin Rathmines West and divided the area between the neighbouring constituencies. Briscoe was re-elected for the re-established Dublin South-Central constituency, which he held until he retired at the 2002 general election.

Briscoe was very critical of the cult of personality surrounding Fianna Fáil leader Charles Haughey during the 1980s, which Briscoe once compared to a "Fascist Dictatorship". Briscoe accordingly helped lead the quietly discontented anti-Haughey faction within Fianna Fáil, which included Charlie McCreevy, during Haughey's time as Taoiseach.

At the 1992 general election Ben Briscoe was involved in a marathon recount battle with Democratic Left's Eric Byrne to decide the fate of the final seat in Dublin South-Central. Briscoe was declared the victor after ten days of re-counting and re-checking ballot papers, leading to Briscoe describing the long count as being like "the agony and the ex-TD."

Lord Mayor of Dublin
In 1988–1989 he was Lord Mayor of Dublin, a post previously held by his father Robert. His term covered the second half of Dublin's Millennium Year 1988. After the City Council had made him Lord Mayor, Briscoe described his selection for the honour as "one of the proudest moments of my life".

The Molly Malone statue previously at the bottom end of Grafton Street and now outside the Dublin Tourist around the corner was unveiled by Briscoe during the Dublin Millennium celebrations in 1988, and he declared 13 June as Molly Malone Day in Dublin.

Family political tradition
Briscoe is one of Ireland's most famous Jewish politicians. The small Irish Jewish community have been enthusiastic and active participants in the country's political and legal world. Briscoe's father was one of several Jews involved in the War of Independence and Sinn Féin movements. In Briscoe's time each of the three main political parties had a Jewish member in Ireland's 166-member Dáil.

References

 

1934 births
Living people
Fianna Fáil TDs
Lord Mayors of Dublin
Members of the 18th Dáil
Members of the 19th Dáil
Members of the 20th Dáil
Members of the 21st Dáil
Members of the 22nd Dáil
Members of the 23rd Dáil
Members of the 24th Dáil
Members of the 25th Dáil
Members of the 26th Dáil
Members of the 27th Dáil
Members of the 28th Dáil
Irish people of Lithuanian-Jewish descent
Jewish Irish politicians